The Baligham, also called the Nepgayidbi ("people of the palace") are an ethnic group in Cameroon.  The Ndaghams left Bafu-Fondong (about 4 km from Dschang, western region of Cameroon), in the mid-18th century due to several factors including Fulani raids or Jihads, and famine caused by desertification.

In their long and eventful migration, the Baligamba kingdom had become too large and after the loss of their leader Gawolbe, quarrels over leadership occurred which led to the breakup of the kingdom into small factions. One by one, faction after faction left, each going their own way until the legitimate successor, Galanga, was left only with a handful of followers.  These he named Nepgayidbi.

Introduction 
Origin of name,
official status, 
location. 
Population, 
look. 
Culture, 
language, 
relationship with neighbours and others.

The people 
Groups

The History 
Post independence
Today
Ahidjo
Pre-independence
Pre WW1
Pre Colonisation
Pre-migration

The Geography 
Landscape
Vegetation
Climate

Politics 
Administration
Public relations

Religion 
Traditional
Christianity
Islam

Tourism 

Ethnic groups in Cameroon